Martin Walsh (born 8 November 1955 in Manchester, England) is an English film editor with more than 30 film credits dating from 1985. Walsh won the Academy Award for Best Film Editing and the ACE Eddie Award for the film Chicago (2002), for which he was also nominated for the BAFTA Award for Best Editing. Walsh has been elected to membership in the American Cinema Editors.

Selected filmography 
The director of each film is indicated in parenthesis.

 Sacred Hearts (Rennie-1985)
 The Fifteen Streets (Wheatley-1989) (TV)
 The Wolves of Willoughby Chase (Orme-1989)
 Courage Mountain (Leitch-1990)
 The Krays (Medak-1990)
 Hear My Song (Chelsom-1991)
 Wild West (Attwood-1992)
 Bad Behaviour (Blair-1993)
 Don't Leave Me This Way (Orme-1993) (TV)
 Dancing Queen (Hamm-1993) (TV)
 Backbeat (Softley-1994)
 Funny Bones (Chelsom-1995)
 Hackers (Softley-1995)
 Feeling Minnesota (Baigelman-1996)
 Welcome to Woop Woop (Elliott-1997)
 Roseanna's Grave (Weiland-1997)
 Hilary and Jackie (Tucker-1998)
 The Mighty (Chelsom-1998)
 Mansfield Park (Rozema-1999)
 Whatever Happened to Harold Smith? (Hewitt-1999)
 Bridget Jones's Diary (Maguire-2001)
 Strictly Sinatra (Capaldi-2001)
 Iris (Eyre-2001)
 Chicago (Marshall-2002)
 Thunderbirds (Frakes-2004)
 Separate Lies (Fellowes-2005)
 Bee Season (McGehee/Siegel-2005)
 V for Vendetta (McTeigue-2005)
 Inkheart (Softley-2008)
 Clash of the Titans (Leterrier-2010)
 Prince of Persia: The Sands of Time (Newell-2010)
 Ra.One (Sinha-2011)
 Wrath of the Titans (Liebesman-2012)
 Jack Ryan: Shadow Recruit (Branagh-2014)
 Cinderella (Branagh-2015)
 Eddie the Eagle (Fletcher-2015)
 Wonder Woman (Jenkins-2017)
 Justice League (Snyder-2017)
Silent Night (Griffin-2021)Tetris (S. Baird-2023)

 References 

 Further reading 
 
 
 This 2015 article is based on an interview with Walsh about his career as an editor and the film Cinderella''.

1955 births
Living people
English film editors
American Cinema Editors
Best Film Editing Academy Award winners